Wilmington YMCA, also known as Wilmington Central YMCA or just Central YMCA, is a historic YMCA building located in Wilmington, New Castle County, Delaware. It was built in 1929, and is a six-story, red brick and Indiana limestone building in a Spanish Colonial Revival style.  It consists of a center six-story, nine-bay main block flanked by five-story, one-bay wings, setback slightly from the main facade.

It was added to the National Register of Historic Places in 2002.

References

External links

Central YMCA website

YMCA buildings in the United States
Clubhouses on the National Register of Historic Places in Delaware
Colonial Revival architecture in Delaware
Buildings and structures completed in 1929
Buildings and structures in Wilmington, Delaware
National Register of Historic Places in Wilmington, Delaware